Paixão is a 2012 Portuguese film directed by Margarida Gil.

Cast
Carloto Cotta as João Lucas
Ana Brandão as Maria Salomé

References

External links
 

2012 films
2012 drama films
Portuguese drama films
Films produced by Paulo Branco